Wu Wenjun (12 May 1919 – 7 May 2017), also commonly known as Wu Wen-tsün, was a Chinese mathematician, historian, and writer. He was an academician at the Chinese Academy of Sciences (CAS), best known for the Wu's method of characteristic set.

Biography
Wu's ancestral hometown was Jiashan, Zhejiang. He was born in Shanghai and graduated from Shanghai Jiao Tong University in 1940. In 1945, Wu taught several months at Hangchow University (later merged into Zhejiang University) in Hangzhou.

In 1947, he went to France for further study at the University of Strasbourg. In 1949, he received his PhD, for his thesis Sur les classes caractéristiques des structures fibrées sphériques, written under the direction of Charles Ehresmann.  Afterwards, he did some work in Paris with René Thom and discovered the Wu class and Wu formula in algebraic topology.  In 1951 he was appointed to a post at Peking University.  However, Wu may have been among a wave of recalls of Chinese academics working in the West following Chiang Kai-shek's ouster from the mainland in 1949, according to eyewitness testimony by Marcel Berger, as he disappeared from France one day, without saying a word to anyone.

Honors and awards
In 1957, he was elected as an academician of the Chinese Academy of Sciences. In 1986 he was an Invited Speaker of the ICM in Berkeley. In 1990, he was elected as an academician of The World Academy of Sciences (TWAS).

Along with Yuan Longping, he was awarded the State Preeminent Science and Technology Award by President Jiang Zemin in 2000, when this highest scientific and technological prize in China began to be awarded. He also received the TWAS Prize in 1990 and the Shaw Prize in 2006. He was the President of the Chinese society of mathematics. He died on May 7, 2017, 5 days before his 98th birthday.

Research
The research of Wu includes the following fields: algebraic topology, algebraic geometry, game theory, history of mathematics, automated theorem proving.  His most important contributions are to algebraic topology.  The Wu class and the Wu formula are named after him.  In the field of automated theorem proving, he is known for Wu's method.

He was also active in the field of the history of Chinese mathematics. He was the chief editor
of the ten-volume Grand Series of Chinese Mathematics, covering the time from antiquity to late part of the Qin dynasty.

Publications
Wen-Tsun, Wu:Rational Homotopy Type: A Constructive Study Via the Theory of the I*-Measure 
Wen-tsun, Wu & Min-de, Cheng, CHINESE MATHEMATICS INTO THE 21ST CENTURY
Wen-tsun, Wu, A THEORY OF IMBEDDING IMMERSION AND ISOTOPY OF POLYTOPES IN A EUCLIDEAN SPACE
Wen-tsun, Wu, Mechanical Theorem Proving in Geometries. 
Wen-Tsun, Wu; Georges Reeb: Sur Les Espaces Fibrés Et Les Variétés Feuilletées
SELECT WORKS OF WEN-TSUN WU 
Wen-tsun, Wu: Mathematics Mechanization: Mechanical Geometry Theorem-Proving, Mechanical Geometry Problem-Solving and Polynomial Equations-Solving 
Wen-Tsun, Wu, and Hu Guo-Ding, eds, Computer Mathematics  .

References

External links
Wu's homepage  

1919 births
2017 deaths
20th-century Chinese mathematicians
21st-century Chinese mathematicians
Algebraic geometers
Educators from Shanghai
Historians from Shanghai
Historians of mathematics
Mathematicians from Shanghai
Members of the Chinese Academy of Sciences
People's Republic of China science writers
Academic staff of Peking University
National Chiao Tung University (Shanghai) alumni
Topologists
TWAS fellows
TWAS laureates
University of Strasbourg alumni
Writers from Shanghai
Academic staff of Zhejiang University